Allobenedenia is a genus of monopisthocotylean monogeneans, included in the family Capsalidae.
All species in this genus are parasitic on external surfaces of marine teleosts.

According to Yang et al., (2004)  species of Allobenedenia are characterised by a haptor with 5 radial loculi formed by 5 radial septa; the central loculus is usually absent.

Species
These species are currently recognized in the genus:

 Allobenedenia convoluta (Yamaguti, 1937) Yamaguti, 1963
 Allobenedenia dischizosepta (Suriano, 1975) Bagnato, Bullard & Cremonte, 2017
 Allobenedenia epinepheli (Bychowsky& Nagibina, 1967)
 Allobenedenia patagonica (Evdokimova, 1969) Yang, Kritsky& Sun, 2004
 Allobenedenia pedunculata Raju & Rao, 1980
 Allobenedenia pseudomarginata (Bravo-Hollis, 1958) Yang, Kritsky& Sun, 2004
 Allobenedenia sebastodi (Egorova, 1994) Yang, Kritsky& Sun, 2004
 Allobenedenia yamagutii (Egorova, 1994) Yang, Kritsky& Sun, 2004
 Allobenedenia zhangi Yang, Kritsky& Sun, 2004

References

Monopisthocotylea
Monogenea genera